Tudor rose is a traditional heraldic emblem of England, first introduced by Henry VII.

Tudor rose may also refer to: 

Tudor Rose (film), 1936 film also known as Nine Days a Queen

See also
Tudor (disambiguation)
English Rose (disambiguation)